
Gmina Sośno is a rural gmina (administrative district) in Sępólno County, Kuyavian-Pomeranian Voivodeship, in north-central Poland.

The gmina contains part of the protected area called Krajna Landscape Park.

Villages
Gmina Sośno contains the villages and settlements of Borówki, Ciosek, Dębiny, Dębowiec, Dziedno, Jaszkowo, Leśniewice, Mierucin, Obodowo, Ostrówek, Płosków, Przepałkowo, Rogalin, Roztoki, Sitno, Skoraczewiec, Skoraczewko, Skoraczewo, Sośno, Świdwie, Szynwałd, Tonin, Toninek, Tuszkowo, Wąwelno, Wielowicz, Wielowiczek and Zielonka.

Neighbouring gminas
Gmina Sośno is bordered by the gminas of Gostycyn, Koronowo, Mrocza, Sępólno Krajeńskie, Sicienko and Więcbork.

References
Polish official population figures 2006

Sosno
Sępólno County